The Phyathai Hospitals Group is a hospital group based in Bangkok, Thailand, and founded in 1976.

The group consists of Phyathai 1 Hospital, Phyathai 2 Hospital, and Phyathai 3 Hospital. Phyathai 1 and Phyathai 2 hospitals are located in the city center of Bangkok, while Phyathai 3 hospital is located in Thonburi.

Accreditations and recognition 
The group is equipped with medical equipment and technology by the Dutch provider Philips. It provides service for international patients and tourists, and provides interpreters, international wards, and free consultation and medical advice over the internet.

Phyathai 2 Hospital received JCI accreditation in 2014.

Hospitals

Phyathai 1 hospital

Phyathai 1 Hospital is a private hospital on Si Ayutthaya Road, Ratchathewi District, Bangkok , not far from Ratchaprarop Station (Airport Rail Link). It was established on 30 July 1976 and specializes in neurosurgery.

Coordinates:

Phyathai 2 International Hospital
Phyathai 2 Hospital is a private hospital in Bangkok, Thailand. It was opened on 22 July 1987.

The hospital is composed of two buildings and covers an area of 11,204 square meters. It has 550 beds and 76 diagnostic rooms. It has outpatient capacity of 2,000 daily.

Phyathai 2 Hospital received JCI accreditation in 2014.

Coordinates:

Phyathai 3 Hospital
Phyathai 3 Hospital is a hospital in Bangkok, Thailand, not far from Bang Wa BTS station. It established on 4 October 1996. It mainly serves patients from the Thonburi side. Healthcare provided includes fertility treatment and mother and baby support.

Coordinates:

See also
 Hospital accreditation
 Bangkok Dusit Medical Services

References

External links

Companies based in Bangkok
Healthcare companies of Thailand
Companies listed on the Stock Exchange of Thailand
Thai brands